Remeți is a commune in Maramureș County, Maramureș, Romania. It is composed of three villages: Piatra, Remeți and Teceu Mic.

The village of Piatra includes the hamlet of Valea lui Francisc, known in German as Franzenthal. This was among the places in Romania where Zipser Germans settled and spoke their dialect of Zipserisch.

References

Communes in Maramureș County
Localities in Romanian Maramureș
Ukrainian communities in Romania